.tj is the Internet country code top-level domain (ccTLD) for Tajikistan. Registrations are processed via accredited registrars.

Second-level domains 
The following second-level domains are available for third-level domain name registration:

 biz.tj, intended for commercial entities
 co.tj, intended for commercial entities
 com.tj, intended for commercial entities

 edu.tj, reserved for educational institutions
 go.tj, reserved for websites of the Government of Tajikistan and government departments/institutions
 gov.tj, reserved for websites of the Government of Tajikistan and government departments/institutions
 info.tj, intended for informational websites

 mil.tj, reserved for the Armed Forces of the Republic of Tajikistan

 name.tj, intended for individuals and Tajik nationals
 net.tj, intended for network providers/operators and organizations implementing projects related to the development of the Internet
 nic.tj, reserved for the Network Information Center and support for the ccTLD
 org.tj, intended for nonprofit organizations

 web.tj, general public domain

External links
 IANA .tj whois information
 .tj domain registration website
 List of .tj accredited registrars

Country code top-level domains
Communications in Tajikistan

sv:Toppdomän#T